KCDSA (Korean Certificate-based Digital Signature Algorithm) is a digital signature algorithm created by a team led by the Korea Internet & Security Agency (KISA). It is an ElGamal variant, similar to the Digital Signature Algorithm and GOST R 34.10-94.

KCDSA requires a collision-resistant cryptographic hash function that can produce a variable-sized output (from 128 to 256 bits, in 32-bit increments).  HAS-160, another Korean standard, is the suggested choice.

Domain parameters

User parameters
 : signer's private signature key such that .
 : signer's public verification key computed by  where .
 : a hash-value of Cert Data, i.e., .

The 1998 spec is unclear about the exact format of the "Cert Data". In the revised spec, z is defined as being the bottom B bits of the public key y, where B is the block size of the hash function in bits (typically 512 or 1024). The effect is that the first input block corresponds to y mod 2^B.

 : the lower B bits of y.

Hash Function
 : a collision resistant hash function with |q|-bit digests.

Signing

To sign a message :

 Signer randomly picks an integer  and computes 
 Then computes the first part: 
 Then computes the second part: 
 If , the process must be repeated from the start.
 The signature is 

The specification is vague about how the integer  be reinterpreted as a byte string input to hash function. In the example in section C.1 the interpretation is consistent with  using the definition of I2OSP from PKCS#1/RFC3447.

Verifying

To verify a signature  on a message :

 Verifier computes 
 Verifier checks if . If so then the signature is valid; otherwise it is not valid.

External links
 KCDSA specification and analysis

Digital signature schemes
Elliptic curve cryptography
Public-key cryptography
Standards of South Korea